Faith Ng (born 25 June 1987) is a Singaporean playwright. Her plays are noted for their rich characterization and sensitive portrayals of Singapore life. She is currently the Associate Artistic Director of Checkpoint Theatre.

Ng is the second daughter of Stefanie, a tutor, and Raymond, a logistics manager. She has a twin sister named Debbie; their elder sister is Cheryl. She is married to theatre academic Assistant Professor Alvin Lim.

Works

Awards 

|-
| 2011
| wo(men)
| Best Original Script, Life! Theatre Awards
| 
|-
| 2014
| For Better Or For Worse
| Best Original Script, Life! Theatre Awards
| 
|-
| 2019
| -
| Young Artist Award
| 
|-

References

1987 births
Living people
Singaporean people of Chinese descent
Singaporean dramatists and playwrights
Nanyang Junior College alumni
National University of Singapore alumni
Alumni of the University of East Anglia
Women dramatists and playwrights